The Nightingale is a historical fiction novel by American author Kristin Hannah published by St. Martin's Press in 2015. The book tells the story of two sisters in France during World War II and their struggle to survive and resist the German occupation of France. The book was inspired by the story of a Belgian woman, Andrée de Jongh, who helped downed Allied pilots escape Nazi territory.

The Nightingale entered multiple bestseller lists upon release and as of 2021, has sold over 4.5 million copies worldwide and been published in 45 languages. The novel was optioned for a screen adaptation by TriStar Pictures in March 2015, with Melanie Laurent signed on to direct the film.

Synopsis 
The book uses the frame story literary device; the frame is presented in first-person narration as the remembrances of an elderly woman in 1995, whose name is initially not revealed to the reader. It is only known that she has a son named Julien and that she lives off the coast of Oregon. However, the main action of the book is told in third-person, following two sisters, Vianne Mauriac and Isabelle Rossignol, who live in France around 1939, on the eve of World War II. The two sisters are estranged from each other and their father, and the book follows the two different paths they take.

Vianne, the eldest sister, is a married schoolteacher raising her 8-year-old daughter Sophie in her childhood home named Le Jardin in the town of Carriveau. Vianne's husband Antoine is drafted and subsequently captured as a prisoner of war. At home, Vianne copes with the occupation of France after the Battle of France, struggling to keep herself and her daughter alive in the face of poor food rations, the dwindling francs left behind by Antoine, the billeting of Wehrmacht and SS officers at her home, the loss of her job, and the increasing persecution of the Jews in town. The first officer billeted at her home is Wolfgang Beck, a kindly man with a family he's left behind. The second is Von Richter, a more sadistic officer who subjects Vianne to physical and sexual abuse.

Later in the novel when Vianne's best friend, Rachel de Champlain, is deported to a concentration camp, she adopts Rachel's three-year-old son, Ari, and renames him "Daniel" to hide his Jewish identity. Soon after, Vianne becomes responsible for hiding nineteen more Jewish children in a nearby abbey's orphanage. Meanwhile, Von Richter uses sexual violence as a means of control over Vianne. When the war ends, Antoine returns from the POW camp, but Vianne must still cope with the aftermath of the occupation—she is pregnant as a result of Von Richter's rape, and Ari, whom she has come to love as a son, is taken away to be raised by his cousins in the United States.

Isabelle, the younger and more impetuous sister, decides to take an active role in resisting the occupation. After being expelled from finishing school, she travels from Paris to Carriveau on foot, meeting a young rebel named Gaëtan Dubois along the way. In Carriveau, she joins the French Resistance and is initially tasked with distributing anti-Nazi propaganda. After moving to a cell in Paris, she develops a plan to help downed Allied airmen escape to the British embassy in neutral Spain, where they can be repatriated. She is successful, and with support from other Resistance operators (including her father, with whom she begins to rebuild a relationship) and the British MI9, this becomes her primary task throughout the war. She earns the code name "Nightingale", and is actively hunted by the Nazis. She is eventually captured, and after her father falsely confesses to being the Nightingale to save her, she is sent to a concentration camp in Germany. She undergoes hellish conditions at the camp but survives long enough to see the end of the war. She makes her way to Vianne, and they reconcile. She reunites with Gaëtan once more before dying from the typhus and pneumonia she has contracted as a result of her mistreatment.

The book concludes with the elderly narrator, revealed to be Vianne, receiving an invitation to an event in Paris to remember her sister, "The Nightingale". She travels with her son Julien, who is unaware of his family's activities during the war and his true parentage. After the event, Vianne reunites with Ari, and she comes to peace with her memories of the war.

Inspiration 

The characters in The Nightingale are not themselves real people, though some of their actions are based on real historical figures. Isabelle's escape route over the Pyrenees for downed Allied airmen was based on the Comet line of 24-year-old Andrée de Jongh,  a Belgian woman who helped aviators and others escape. Much like Isabelle, de Jongh personally escorted many over the Pyrenees on foot; by the end of the war, she had aided 118 airmen. Also like Isabelle, de Jongh was captured late in the war and sent to the Ravensbrück concentration camp rather than executed, as the Nazis disbelieved her assertion that she was herself the organizer of the route. However, de Jongh lived on long after the war, becoming a countess in 1985 and eventually dying in 2007, whereas in the novel Isabelle dies shortly after being freed from the camp.

The story of De Jongh also inspired Hannah to conduct further research and found stories during the French Resistance about women who were willing to put their lives and their children at risk in order to shelter Jewish families; this became the inspiration for Vianne's character in the book. Other historical figures mentioned include the World War I nurse Edith Cavell.

Reception 

Reviews of the book were generally positive. A review published by Kirkus Reviews notes, "[Hannah's] tendency to sentimentalize undermines the gravitas of this tale...Still, a respectful and absorbing page-turner." The novel also sold well: it spent 45 weeks on the NPR Hardcover Fiction Bestseller List and 20 weeks on the New York Times bestseller list.

Film adaptation 
The book was optioned in March 2015 by TriStar Pictures for screen adaptation, with Ann Peacock to write and Elizabeth Cantillon to produce. In August 2016 it was announced that Michelle MacLaren will direct and rewrite the film with John Sayles, until MacLaren left before production shutdown. In December 2019, Melanie Laurent signed on to direct from a script by Dana Stevens with Cantillon still attached to produce. Dakota and Elle Fanning will star, marking the first time the sisters have shared scenes in a film; previously they had played the same character at different ages, in separate scenes.

On June 23, 2017, TriStar scheduled the film to be released on August 10, 2018. On March 2, 2020, TriStar pushed the film to December 25, 2020. On April 24, 2020, TriStar briefly removed the film from the release calendar due to the COVID-19 pandemic. On April 30, 2020, TriStar rescheduled the film to be released on December 22, 2021. On February 19, 2021, TriStar pushed the film again to December 23, 2022. On October 22, 2021, TriStar removed the film from the release calendar.

References 

2015 American novels
Historical novels
Novels set during World War II
Novels set in France
Novels set in Oregon
Fiction set in 1939
Fiction set in 1995
Novels set in the 1930s
Novels set in the 1990s
St. Martin's Press books